Knefastia chira is an extinct species of sea snail, a marine gastropod mollusc in the family Pseudomelatomidae, the turrids and allies.

Description

Distribution
This extinct marine species was found in Oligocene strata in northern Peru; age range 37.2 to 33.9 Ma.

References

External links
 Fossilworks: Knefastia chira

chira
Gastropods described in 1931